Derby County Women are an English women's football club affiliated with Derby County F.C. The first team currently play in the  Division.

In 2008–09 the club won promotion to the league from the Midland Combination Women's Football League, after beating Crewe 4–2 at Pride Park. In addition to the first team, the club runs a reserve team who compete within the national reserve team pyramid, and nine academy teams that compete in the Derbyshire Girls League and the Central Warwickshire Girls League. The club enjoys a strong working relationship with the Derby County Girls Regional Talent Centre, allowing a dedicated player pathway from youth football into the Derby County Women senior squads.

History

The Birth of Derby County FC Women
The club that was to become Derby County WFC started out as the idea of Sheila Rollinson and Jess Reid, who at the time were both playing for the Coventry-based women's side Holbrooks Athletic. Sheila had recently moved to the Derby area and Jess lived in Burton, so they came up with the idea of forming a new more locally based team.

Adverts for players were placed in both the Burton Mail and the Derby Evening Telegraph and at that time more of the replies came from the Burton area, so Burton Wanderers was born. The club's first season was 1978–9 in the Midland League (which later became the West Midlands League) and saw the club playing at Shobnall Fields in Burton, with Phil Rollinson as manager and Bob Reid acting as club secretary. Training sessions were held in Bitham School sports hall.

After one season in the Midland league the club decided to move to the Nottingham League (later the East Midlands League) due to the standard of football being of a higher level. At this time a national women's league was not in place and as such the club regularly played against teams such as Doncaster Belles, which at the time contained most of the England team. Junior leagues were not in place and with girls not being allowed to play in boys’ teams, the side often had 11–13-year-olds playing alongside adults.

With the demise of another local side, Derby Rangers, a number of experienced players joined the club and in 1985 the club secured its first sponsorship deal with the Beacon Hotel. The deal saw the club's name change to Beacon Wanderers. During this period Dave Elks enjoyed a lengthy spell as the club's manager before handing over to Malcolm Aldridge. Gradually the balance of players swung more towards the Derby area and as the club name no longer included Burton, it seemed sensible to move both matches and training sessions to Derby. For a while, Leesbrook school was the venue for both before eventually Derby City Council's Parkers Piece ground became the club's home.

In 1990, John Jarman started the Community Department at Derby County Football Club and in the same year, he held discussion with the management of Beacon Wanderers which eventually led to the formation of Derby County Ladies FC. At that time the club consisted of a single open-age team, however, the association with Derby County quickly saw it extended to a reserve and third team. The first manager of the newly formed DCLFC was Neil Crofts.

Early years
Training was moved from Leesbrook to the now-defunct DCFC Ramarena training ground, with the club playing an FA cup tie there. In 1993 the FA were instructed by UEFA to take over the running of Women's football and as a result, a structure was put into place which eventually saw the setting up of the National League structure. This was done on a selection as opposed to results basis, with the FA identifying which teams it felt were appropriate for leagues within the structure.

As part of this the Midland Combination league was formed with Derby County becoming founder members. At this juncture, Maggit and Deb Newham became the first female managers of the club. In 1997, Raf Long made contact with the club in order to secure coaching hours to contribute to his UEFA B licence qualification. This marked the start of a long association with the club, which saw Raf become its chairman, a post that he eventually relinquished in 2013.

The Millennium and a Rise to National League Level

2001/02
DCLFC recruited their first "official" junior squads which led to them having U14 and U12 squads competing in Notts Girls League for first time. Both teams enjoyed hugely successful seasons with each achieving the league and cup double. The U12 were jointly managed by Dougie Orr & Mick Simpkins whose daughter Emily went on to play in the Women's Super League. Steve Hall managed the U14 side which included Precious Hamilton, a player who would go on to represent the club a senior level as well as going on to play WSL football for Notts County.

The same season saw the club's senior side struggle under the helm of then manager, Richard Astle. A number had left the club to join Sandiacre Town and relegation to the Unison East Midlands League came in the penultimate game of the season when a 98th minute of injury time goal by Stafford Rangers saw both teams relegated.

2002/03
The following season was one of consolidation although the club did reach the league's cup semi final where they lost to eventual league champions, Nottingham Forest. At junior level the club continued to blossom with a number of successes achieved

2003/04
This season saw DCLFC strengthened at Junior level with the introduction of a further two age-specific sides. At senior level, Steve Hall stepped up to become first team manager and under his stewardship the club secured runners up spot behind Leicester City, whilst they lost in the league cup final to the same side.

2004/05
This proved to be the club's most successful season to that point with their history, with the first team completing a league and cup double in the Unison East Midlands Premier Division, which saw them gain promotion to the Midland Combination League. The Reserves finished a creditable third in the newly formed Reserve division, and in doing so moved up a level to play in the Combination League. At junior level the club's sides continued to secure silverware on a number of fronts.

2005/06
Derby County Ladies participates as a founder member of the inaugural FA Midland Centre of Excellence programme, with teams competing at U16 and U14 age group. Their participation in the programme reaped immediate reward in the form of England recognition for U16 captain Cara Newton. At senior level the first team enjoyed a season of consolidation, finishing a creditable 4th in their first season in the Midland Combination League. Notable results included a seven-goal mauling of TNS (who were league leaders at the time) in January, and a single goal victory over eventual league champions Crewe in the last game of the season. The Reserves also competed admirably in their first season in the Midland Combination Reserves League.

2006/07 & 2007/08
Both seasons saw the club compete at the top end of the Midland Combination league, whilst the club's junior sides continued to enjoy successful seasons across the board.

2008/09
The 2008–09 season was seen as a landmark one in the club's history as the first team not only won the league cup but finally won the Midland Combination league following a 4–2 win over Crewe in final League game of the season. The fixture was played at Derby County FC's Pride Park stadium and the result saw the club gain promotion to the Women's Premier League. The club's Reserves won Reserve Cup, whilst their U16s, U12's and U10's all achieved league and cup double success.

2009/10
The Ewe Rams first season proved to be a tough baptism in the WPL. Needing two points from the last two games to ensure they retained their status in the league, Derby travelled to Aston Villa for the penultimate game of the season. With 30 minutes remaining, they found themselves 2–0 down before staging a brilliant come-back, with a fantastic Emily Jeffery strike sealing a 3–2 victory and with it safety
2010–11 proved to be Steve Hall's final one as manager, prior to him stepping down and it proved to be a successful one as the club secured a commendable 5th-place finish behind league champions Aston Villa and runners up Coventry City.

2011/12
The next season saw former junior coach, John Bennett return to the club as its first team manager when John Townson's brief tenure in charge was halted when he was given a professional contract closer to his North West home. The season once again proved successful with the club again finishing 5th. Manchester City pipping Sheffield FC to the title

2012/13
The 2012–13 season proved to be poor after the previous two and saw the club finish one place off the bottom of the league. However, with only one team being relegated and local rivals Leicester City securing only four points all season, the clubs were never in danger of losing their WPL status. During this season the FA announced the launch of the Women's Super league (WSL) and invited applications from clubs playing at Premier League level. Derby submitted an application to join the league, however, it proved unsuccessful falling short of the required challenging criteria in a number of areas. Shortly after the outcome was advised, Raf Long ended his 16-year association with the club, as he stepped down as the club's chairman to take up the Director role at the Leicester City Centre Of Excellence.

National Awards and a Push Towards WSL

2013/14
The club started the 2013–14 season without a chairman, however, they were able to welcome FA Regional Coach John Griffiths to the club in a mentoring role initially to the club's senior coaching staff.

On the back of the failed WSL bid, the club's committee decided to look towards a more commercially and business-focused model and sought to appoint a new figure head to lead the club in addressing the shortcomings that had been identified within the failed bid.

Duncan Gibb, an experienced Commercial Manager within the leisure and sport industry, took up an offer to join the club as its Chief Executive in September 2013. Gibb moved quickly to address two identified weaknesses, namely a lack of external investment and a poor profile. He secured club partners (sponsors) for each of the team's 10 sides before turning his attention to the club's profile and securing a dedicated slot for the club on BBC Radio Derby's Sportscene programme.

On the back of this dedicated weekly club columns in both the Derby Telegraph and Burton Mail were secured on the back of meetings with the respective papers' editors. On the pitch Gibb appointed Griffiths to a newly created Director Of Football role that saw him introduce a playing philosophy throughout the club and in essence run the football side of things, while Gibb looked to address the off-field shortcomings within the WSL bid.

The season proved to be John Bennett's last as manager and he guided the club to a respectable 7th-place finish after the previous disappointing season. Bennett took the decision due to family commitments and one of his last games at the helm saw the club win the Derbyshire County Cup for a third consecutive year beating Sandiacre Town 6–2 in the final.

As part of its plans to raise the club's profile, a friendly match was secured against 11 times league champions and former Champions League winners, Arsenal FC. A club-record crowd of 600 saw a full strength Arsenal side consisting of England internationals, Kelly Smith, Rachel Yankey and Casey Stoney eventually defeat a resilient Rams side 5-0

2014/15
Following receipt of over 30 applications the club returned to a female manager, appointing Jenny Sugarman to the role. Unfortunately, after an encouraging start to the season, results deteriorated and with the club firmly entrenched in a relegation battle they parted company with Sugarman shortly prior to Xmas.

Reserve Team Managers, Ash Abbey and Jack White undertook the role in an interim basis steadying the ship, before Stuart Wilson was appointed at the start of February. Wilson had previously won the league with Aston Villa and had recently been interviewed for the England U17's management role. Ironically the role had been secured by John Griffiths who as a result was forced to relinquish his Director Of Football role at Derby County.

Wilson's tenure couldn't have been any more challenging starting with two marquee friendly fixtures against firstly reigning WSL Champions, Liverpool and a week later against reigning FA Cup holders, Arsenal. The games saw both clubs field full-strength sides with gates of over 600 witnessing each. The Liverpool game had been initially postponed due to a frozen pitch with over 1,000 tickets having already been snapped up, however the rescheduled date fell on the same night that the men's club played. With these marquee friendly fixtures out of the way, Wilsons impact was immediate and the side embarked on an incredible sequence of results that saw them not only avoid relegation, but secure a top half 6th-placed finish

Off the pitch, representatives of the club attended the annual FA Awards in London, where they saw the club secure runners up spot in the FA Club Of The Year awards on the back of the previous year's developments both on and off the pitch. However, the best was saved until last when club founder Sheila Rollinson picked up the main award of the night when she was recognised for her ‘ Outstanding Contribution To Women's Football ‘. The award was not just seen as a hugely justified accolade for her part in the amazing journey of Derby County from a local parks side to an established WPL club, but for her contribution to the wider game.

2015/16
On the pitch the club increased its portfolio of teams to 11 with the introduction of a U18s side to act as a conduit between its senior and academy sides.

At first team level the club continued where it left off the previous season and topped the table going into December before the club's form plummeted leading to early exits in both the FA and League Cups and a slump to 7th place in the league.

With targets of a run in at least one of the cups and a top five finish agreed at the start of the season, Manager Stuart Wilson and his Assistant Neil Wilson left the club with three games of the season left, which included the Derbyshire County Cup tie with big-spending Long Eaton. Despite only being able to field four first team players, Ewe Rams delivered a superb performance on the day resulting in a 5–1 victory under the guidance of Reserve Team Manager, Petter Asser.

Off the field, the club continued to make significant strides in a number of areas. Dave Cholerton was appointed to the newly created Academy Director role that saw him oversee each of the club's 9 junior sides, whilst the club's executive committee was replaced with a Board Of Directors consisting of a Finance Director, Operations Director, Media Director and Commercial Director.

Reward for the club's progress was realised firstly at local level as the club won the Derby City Club Of the Year Award, before the club was acclaimed nationally when it walked away from the FA Awards at Wembley Stadium named as the ‘ FA Premier League Club Of the Year ‘.

As part of the club's ambitions to put into place the foundations of a subsequent WSL bid, the club relocated to Mickleover Sports FC's, Don Amott LG Arena in January 2016.

2016/17
The club continued to make significant strides off the pitch during the close season, while matching these on the pitch.

Sam Griffiths, a UEFA A License Coach was appointed to the role of Director of Football with a view to re-imbedding the playing and coaching philosophies that her predecessor John Griffiths had begun to implement during his tenure in the role.

In addition to this, John Bennett returned for his second spell as Manager and was joined by a number of locally based coaching and support staff, with the club openly stating in the media that it wished to return to the 'Derby Way' a moniker applied to the men's arm of the club in the media following the sacking of Paul Clement earlier in the year, but one that had been formally identified and applied to the club's ladies side back in 2013 by John Griffiths.

As part of her early work, Griffiths introduced an Under 18's Development side to the structure increasing the number of sides within the club to 12, and re-branded the Reserve team the Development side as the club looked to further replicate the men's arm of the club in terms of an operating model.

In terms of personnel the club invested in six new signings with all but one of those coming from the WSL. These included Sheffield FC club legend' Lisa Giampalma, Doncaster Belles' Molly Johnson and ex Manchester City player' Leanne De Silva.

Off the field the club appointed Andy Moore as its Media Director with a remit of introducing the best club website outside of the WSL and improving the club's social media face. As part of his work Moore quickly moved towards formally establishing links with Derby Universities media studies section.
With the addition of players and personnel the club once again delivered both on and off the pitch.
 
On the pitch, pre-season targets of a top-five finish and a run in one of the cups were realised, as the club equalled its highest ever league position following a final day victory over local rivals Nottingham Forest. Bennett's side would however almost certainly have surpassed expectation and secured a top three finish, had it not been for a significant injury crisis to key personnel, that saw Lorna Abbey side-lined for the majority of the season, Sam Griffiths and Emily Jeffrey sustain season ending ACL injuries and Lisa Giampalma side-lined for six weeks with what was at one stage thought to be a career-ending eye injury. Towards the end of the season things had in fact got that bad, that Bennett didn't have a single centre half to call on, having started the season with six of them !
 
Following a disappointing League Cup exit at the hands of Division 1, Chester Le-Street, Bennetts side progressed to the third round of the FA Cup on the back of victories over Huddersfield Town and Sheffield United. The win over The Blades saw them rewarded with a mouth-watering tie with local rivals Nottingham Forest, which saw the club once again break its record attendance with over 800 supporters creating a fantastic atmosphere. Whilst the crowd was easily the biggest of the competition at that stage and surpassed the men's clubs crowd for their Checkatrade Cup home tie with Mansfield Town, a solitary goal against the run of play saw the visitors progress to the next round.
 
The club's Academy under, Dave Cholerton continued to develop with seven league titles and cup successes secured by the end of the season. Perhaps more pleasing than that was progressing of players from within the club's Under 18's side to the First Team, with forward Ellie May and goalkeeper Charlotte Clarke both featuring regularly towards the latter part of the season, with the former also being called up to John Griffiths England U17's squad.
 
Off the field the club were once again in the mix at the FA Awards at Wembley, securing runners up in the 'FA Premier League Club Of The Year' category, whilst Academy Director, Dave Cholerton came runner up to former England legend, Hope Powell in the ‘ Outstanding Contribution To Women’s Football ’ award. Cholerton's input into the club's delivery was probably best captured when 64 schools and over 700 pupils attended the club's annual schools football festival in March.
 
The club's new website was launched at the start of November and was very quickly recognised as the best in the Premier League, fully justifying the appointment of Andy Moore as Media Director. By the end of the season the website had secured over 60,000 hits and was on course to deliver 150,000 within its first year.
 
‘Partnerships’ were seen as the key priority for CEO, Duncan Gibb when he addressed the club's annual Xmas function at Pride Park Stadium and by the end of the season key partnerships with both Derby University and Merrill Academy were at an advanced stage of negotiation, whilst talks were also underway to discuss a long-term partnership commitment to Mickleover Sports and their Don Amott Arena ground.

2017/18
Going into the 2017–18 season, off the pitch the board set about aims to achieve five key partnerships over the course of two years but efficiently achieved all within one year, ensuring the future of the Ewe Rams was secure off the pitch as they prepared to switch their focus to the playing side.

The first key partnership was secured with Merrill Academy with 1st Team training reverting to their impressive facilities that included a new 4G pitch, gym and physio facilities.

The second key partnership that was secured was with Derby University where the club linked up with the newly formed Football Journalism course to create three scholarships for women football players each year, over the next three seasons to join both the course and the Ewe Rams. A video promo saw the likes of former England International Kelly Smith and leading Sports Journalist and Presenter Jacqui Oatley advertise the course and the first scholar was recruited for the 2018–19 season.

With first team games having moved to Mickleover Sports FC back in Jan 2016, the club secured a third key partnership with the club signing a 3-year extension to the tenancy with both clubs signing a memorandum to explore the Ewe Rams becoming a stakeholder in the ground.

Despite securing Merrill Academy as a partner with their excellent facilities, the opportunity for the club's senior teams to train at Derby County's Moor Farm Training facility become available and towards the end of the season, the club secured a fourth partnership, which became a prelude to the 5th partnership and moved its First Team training sessions to the training centre.

The move to Moor Farm for 1st Team training was only the beginning of what became the Ewe Rams fifth and most important partnership when Derby County FC agreed to greater synergy and formed the #OneClub approach offering financial, operational and admin support to the Ladies arm of the team.

During the 2017–18 season, the opportunity to apply for a place in a new look FA Women's Football League structure was opened and Derby County Ladies with the support of Derby County put in a strong application to become a semi-professional FA Women's Championship side. Despite a strong bid the application was turned down with the club remaining in the FA National League structure.

Despite the rejection, the FA named the Ewe Rams as the Club of the Year for the second time in three seasons thus becoming the only two-time winners of the title. That along with being named both the Derby City Council Club of the Year and the Derby Telegraph Sports Club of the Year saw the club finish a successful season off the pitch.

On the pitch, the club finished a mediocre 7th in the FA Women's Premier Northern Division, a poor season by the Ewe Rams standard with the club also dumped out of both Cup competitions by lower league opposition. Manager John Bennett announced towards the end of the season that he would step down from the Manager's position at the end of the campaign, ending his long association with the club.

Having been the club's Director of Football for the past two seasons, Sam Griffiths relinquished that role to become the club's new Manager for the start of the 2018–19 season. Along with the decision to step into the Manager's hot-seat, Griffiths also retired from playing having not played since the 2016–17 season due to injury, thus concentrating on her new position.

2018/19
Off the pitch, the club secured an extra key partnership as the linked up with the UK's leading Sports College, Loughborough College to create an educational partnership for young women footballers aged 16–19. This partnership will see the club work with the college to provide opportunities for players to develop with the Ewe Rams.

On the pitch, Griffiths recruited 10 players with a number of key signings joining including key signings Jodie Redgrave from Brighouse Town LFC, Steph Smith and Callan Barber from Coventry United LFC and Olivia Mitcham joining from Leicester City WFC. Also returning to the club was former fan favourite Cara Newton after a 3-year spell with local rivals Long Eaton United LFC. Also joining the club were Rachael Ball (From Stoke City LFC), Emily Joyce (Birmingham City WFC), Leah Kellogg (Long Eaton United LFC), Monique Watson (Doncaster Rovers Belles) and Moriah McIntosh (Leicester City WFC)

With the closer synergy between the main club, the Ewe Rams were afforded an opportunity to play local rivals Nottingham Forest Ladies at Pride Park Stadium in early September in front of a new National League record of 2,109 fans, the second-highest attendance seen to date across all leagues in the UK. The Ewe Rams secured the win in the fixture when local girl and Derby County fan, Amy Sims, headed the only goal of the game to ensure all three points.

That proved to be a catalyst for the season with Sam Griffiths squad continuing their improvement in the league as crucial wins against Sunderland Ladies and Stoke City Ladies, and a 10–0 win over Bradford City Women saw the club head into the back end of the season looking for their best-ever finish. That was achieved as the Ewe rams won their final four games of the season to finish joint second with Sunderland Ladies, only finishing below them on goal difference behind Champions Blackburn Rovers Ladies.

Elsewhere, the Development Team regained the Derbyshire FA County Cup with a 4–0 win over Long Eaton United Ladies at their Grange Park home and it was a double celebration with Tommy Booth's side also finishing in their highest ever position In the FA Midland Reserve Division as they earned a runners-up spot behind Stoke City Women.

The success was replicated in the Derby County Ladies Academy with 13 trophies across all clubs in the biggest Academy intake in the club's history and one that will be strengthen further with the addition of an Under 18's side next season. The Foundation Team also earned a move, as a runners-up spot in the Derbyshire Women's League saw them invited into the East Midlands Regional League and a rebranding as the Derby County Ladies Community side.

Off the pitch, the strengthened alignment of the club with Derby County saw the Ewe Rams short-listed for 'Improving the Participation of Women & Girls Initiative' award at the annual FA Awards, held at St George's Park, the fifth straight year of nominations at the event and the only club with this accolade.

2019/20
It was a busy off-season for Manager Sam Griffiths with 7 new faces joining the club. Ellie Gilliatt made the move from FA Championship side Sheffield United WFC, to be joined by former Leicester City WFC trio Sherry McCue, Sarah Jackson and Sophie Domingo. Former Nottingham Forest captain Kelly Darby joined as did Stoke City WFC pair Hannah Keryakoplis and Emily Owen.

The Ewe Rams said goodbye to club stalwarts Camilla Newton and Grace Harrison, whilst youngster Karagh Tait went to University in the US and football legend Andi Bell retired from Tier 3 football after a 20+ career, scoring goals for fun.

During the season, former Ewe Ram Megan Tinsley returned on a permanent deal from Sheffield United Women after a short loan spell midway through the winter, whilst in the New Year, another former DCFCW youngster returned as Ellie May rejoined the club. Another signing in the New Year saw the experienced Jodie Michalska sign for the club.

Another record FA Women's National League crowd of 2,318 at Pride Park Stadium saw the Ewe Rams fall to a 1–0 defeat to local rivals Nottingham Forest WFC but an unbeaten run after Christmas saw the club finish the curtailed 2019–20 season in second place when the season was voided due to the global COVID-19 pandemic.

Under Academy Director Dave Cholerton, the DCFCW Academy continued to thrive in its respective leagues up until the game was halted in March, however in a further boost to the club, a collaborative pathway with the Derby County Girls RTC was formalised to strengthen the club's future.

The implementation of a Governance Board at the club to sit alongside its Operational Board further strengthened the link between Derby County FC with Nick Britten appointed as chairman with Derby County Chief Executive Stephen Pearce and Rams legend Michael Johnson also sitting on the Governance Board, alongside Vice-chair Faye Nixon, Secretary Sarah Bailey, Claire Twells and Lauren Asquith.

Record levels of club sponsorship were secured, with every sponsoring opportunity within the portfolio taken and another Tier 2 license bid was submitted, though ultimately with the voiding of the season, all bids were denied.

2020/21 
With the start of the 2020–21 season delayed due to the global situation, the season began in late September with more changes to the squad during the off-season. England Under-21 Goalkeeper Charlotte Clarke returned to the club from Stoke City Women and she was joined by midfielder Jade Formaston from FA Championship side Coventry United Ladies, Katie Anderson who made her return from a long-term knee injury and Norwegian defender Caroline Naess.

Departing from the club was club-record goalscorer Cara Newton who retired from the game through injury having scored 86 goals for the Ewe Rams. Also leaving was another stalwart of the club Nikki Ledgister who moved abroad though she did return for the first game of the season to say her goodbyes. Other departures included Ellie Gilliatt who moved closer to home due to work commitments, Goalkeeper Leah Kellogg who returned to previous club Long Eaton United LFC, Rosie Axten moved to Nottingham Forest WFC with Monique Watson also departing.

A new batch of Football Journalism Scholars joined the club as part of its partnership with Derby University with three new signings joining our Under 20 side who took the place of the Community Team which disbanded at the end of the previous season, moving to the East Midlands Women's Regional League. Also disbanding was the Development Team with the new player pathway forging closer links between the academy and senior set-up.

The club once again bid for a position in the FA Women's Championship but missed out on a place. As a club we were open in our disappointment at the FA re-opening what had been a very clearly communicated process, and allowing late submissions which resulted in Sunderland being taken up, but delighted that the FA advised that our application was fully compliant across all areas. This therefore appears to put the club in a strong position going forwards.

The 2020–21 campaign was cut short for the second season in a row due to the COVID-19 Pandemic with only the Women's FA Cup continuing. A solid 6–0 win over Loughborough Foxes and a 4–1 win at West Brom Women safely moved the Ewe Rams into the fourth round where they narrowly went down 3–2 to fellow National League Northern side Huddersfield Town Women to end their 2020–21 campaign.

The academy season was once again interrupted but strong performances across all age groups saw a feeling of further development. During the off-season, the club was once again able to hold its Annual Development days ahead of the upcoming season.

The biggest news across the club during saw the culmination of its long process to have a ground they could call home as the club become a formal partner in the CIC at Mickleover FC and one of very few clubs in the UK, owning their own ground. The ground was re-developed ahead of the 2021–22 season with a brand new 3G pitch, whilst the stand was also given an upgrade.

Colours and badge
The playing colours of Derby County FC Women are identical to those of parent club Derby County F.C. – The club crest is a mirror of the main club's albeit with the wording Derby County Football Club Women underneath.

Stadium
The Don Amott LG Arena, home of Mickleover Sports FC and based at Station Road, Mickleover, Derby, DE3 9FE which has a capacity of 4,000 people.

Players

Current squad

Former players

Notable former personnel 

 Cara Newton (England)
 John Griffiths (England U17 Manager)

Honours 
 Derbyshire County FA Women's Senior Cup: 
 Winners (6): 2011–2012, 2012–2013, 2013–2014, 2014–15, 2015–2016, 2016–17
 Midland Combination Women's Football League: 
 Winners (1): 2008–09
 Midland Combination Women's League Cup: 
 Winners (2): 2007–08, 2008–09
 Finalists (1): 2006–07
 Unison East Midlands Women's League: 
 Winners (1): 2004–05
 Unison East Midlands Women's League Cup: 
 Winners (1): 2004–05
 2015–16 County Cup Winners
 FA Premier League Club Of The Year 2015–16

Staff
Board of Directors
 Chief Executive - Duncan Gibb
 Finance Director - Stephen Joughin
 Media Director - Andy Moore
 Operations Director - Dave Marriott
 Academy Director - Dave Cholerton
 Commercial Director - Chris Partridge
 Club Secretary - Sheila Rollinson
 Social Director - Alison Cope
Partner Liaison Director - Richard Pope

Governance Board

 Chair - Nick Britten (Head of Corporate Comms at DCFC)
 Vice-chair - Faye Nixon (Head of Marketing at DCFC)
 Secretary - Sarah Bailey (Corporate Solicitor at Geldards)
 Board Member - Stephen Pearce (Chief Executive at DCFC)
 Board Member - Michael Johnson (Club Ambassador at DCFC)
 Board Member - Claire Twells (Business Development Partner at Smith Partnership)

Football Staff

 1st Team Manager - Sam Griffiths
 1st Team Coach - Jenny Simpson
 1st Team Coach - Kiran Savage
 1st Team Coach - Sarah Green
 Goalkeeping Coach - Damian Morgan
 Sports Therapist - Neil Snelson
 S&C Coach - Matt Mayer
 U20 Joint Manager & Lead Development Coach - Dan Dobrzycki
 U20 Joint Manager - Franco Buonaguro

References

External links
Official website

Association football clubs established in 1989
Ladies
Women's football clubs in England
Sport in Derby
Football clubs in Derbyshire
FA Women's National League teams
1989 establishments in England